Horspath Halt was an intermediate station on the Wycombe Railway which served the Oxfordshire village of Horspath from 1908 to 1915, and then from 1933 to 1963. The opening of the halt was part of an attempt by the Great Western Railway to encourage more passengers on the line at a time when competition from bus services was drawing away patronage. The possibility of reopening the line through Horspath Halt has been explored by Chiltern Railways, the franchise holder for the Chiltern Main Line which runs through .

History

Although the line ran through the village of Horspath, notably through a  tunnel, it was to be a further 40 years before a station was opened here. In an attempt to stimulate Oxford suburban traffic, the Great Western Railway opened three motor halts on the line, one of which was to be situated to the south of Horspath Tunnel. The Board of Trade approved the opening of the halts in December 1907, and they opened to traffic in February 1908; the Board of Trade's Colonel Yorke later inspected the halts the following month. In the event, the halt remained open only for seven years, closing in 1915 as a wartime economy measure.

The halt was perched on an embankment, the corrugated iron passenger shelter being suspended off the bank with the aid of timbers to the rear of the platform into the embankment side. Access to the halt was had via a sloping 1 in 10 fenced path leading up from the Cuddesdon Road where a wicket gate with a lamp was provided. It was to be initially served by 5 trains each way daily, and up to 500 passengers per month were expected.

During the Second World War, the local Home Guard cut slits through the corrugated iron shelter so that, in the event of invasion, it might serve as a sort of pillbox. On the basis of an estimated saving of £34,372, passenger services were withdrawn between Oxford and Princes Risborough from January 1963. The track between Thame and Morris Cowley was lifted in 1969, the allegedly deteriorating condition of Horspath Tunnel playing a large part in the decision.

Present day

Nothing remains of the halt, but the track is in situ from a point about 500m west of the site of the halt.  The line from here to Kennington Junction is used by car-carrying trains from the BMW Mini plant (see Morris Cowley railway station).  The trackbed remains to the east as far as  where housing has been built on the site of the former station. A section of the trackbed was purchased in 1982 by Horspath Parish Council who manage the cutting as a nature reserve. The tunnel is owned by Oxfordshire County Council and was converted into a bat hibernaculum in 2002.

As part of its preparations for its bid to run the Chiltern Railways franchise, Chiltern Railways announced in 2000 that it was looking into the possibility of reinstating passenger services on the line between Oxford and Risborough, the cost of which it estimated at £250m. It was decided instead to build a  link between the Oxford to Bicester Line and the Chiltern Main Line in order to run through services between Oxford and London via High Wycombe.

References

Sources

External links 
 Station on navigable 1946 O.S. map

Disused railway stations in Oxfordshire
Former Great Western Railway stations
Railway stations in Great Britain opened in 1908
Railway stations in Great Britain closed in 1915
Railway stations in Great Britain opened in 1933
Railway stations in Great Britain closed in 1963
1908 establishments in England